Typha pallida  is a plant species native to Kazakhstan, Tajikistan, Uzbekistan and China (Hebei, Nei Mongol, Xinjiang). It grows in freshwater marshes and along the banks of streams and lakes. The species is closely related to T. minima.

References

pallida
Freshwater plants
Flora of Kazakhstan
Flora of Tajikistan
Flora of Uzbekistan
Flora of Hebei
Flora of Xinjiang
Flora of Inner Mongolia
Plants described in 1949